Live in Yugoslavia is a live album from the punk band the Anti-Nowhere League. It was recorded in Moša Pijade Hall in Zagreb, Yugoslavia on April 24, 1983 and released and pressed later in the same year in England on I.D Records. The CD was anecdotally edited to remove foul language and crude references to the recently deceased former president Tito, but nothing was edited or removed on the original 1983 vinyl release.

The LP was recorded live using the mobile equipment of sound engineer Nenad Zubak and his crew. Original of the recording was on a radio tape. The recording was later additionally mixed by Ted Sharp and the band members at the Rockfield Studios.

The LP cover was designed by Crunchic and Sirc Nirbag and the art featured artist's impression of the Flag of the Socialist Federal Republic of Yugoslavia with its map on fire. Back cover contained photographs of the members taken by Goranka Matic on the streets of Zagreb.

Track listing
(all songs written by the Anti-Nowhere League except where noted).
"Let's Break the Law"
"Streets of London" (Ralph McTell)
"Let the Country Feed You"
"We Will Survive"
"Snowman"
"I Hate People"
"For You"
"Going Down"
"Woman"
"Can't Stand Rock 'n' Roll"
"So What?"
"Reck-A-Nowhere"
"Paint It, Black" (Mick Jagger, Keith Richards)
"We Are the League"

See also
Punk rock in Yugoslavia

References

Anti-Nowhere League albums
1983 live albums
1980s in Zagreb